Redhill Aerodrome  is an operational general aviation aerodrome located  south-east of Redhill, Surrey, England, in green belt land.

Redhill Aerodrome has a CAA Ordinary Licence (Number P421) that allows flights for the public transport of passengers or for flying instruction as authorised by the licensee (Redhill Aerodrome Limited).

It is serviced by a brasserie and coffee house called The Pilot's Hub which is situated within Hangar 9 at the aerodrome. The Pilot's Hub is open 7 days a week and is open to the public. It has a large outdoor viewing area and seating area as well as indoor seating and conference room hire. Hangar 9 itself is full of light aircraft, many of them historic, and visitors to The Pilot's Hub can walk around the hangar to see the aircraft close up.

Early history
The airfield came into use in the 1930s for private flying and it was used as an alternative airfield to Croydon Airport by Imperial Airways.

No. 15 Elementary and Reserve Flying Training School RAF was formed at Redhill on 1 July 1937. Training continued at the start of the Second World War using the Miles Magister. The school was renamed to the No. 15 Elementary Flying Training School RAF on 3 September 1939.

The Fairey Battle was also flown particularly for use with the Polish Grading and Testing Flight which was formed here on 14 March 1940.

With the threat of a German attack on the airfield the Flying Training School moved to northern England in June 1940.

RAF Redhill
With the withdrawal of the Flying Training School the airfield became an operational RAF station. First to move in were 16 Squadron operating the Westland Lysander. The Lysanders did not stay long and RAF Redhill had many short-term deployments, mainly of fighter squadrons.

In August 1942 the airfield had five squadrons based. By the end of 1943 the fighter squadrons had moved on and the airfield was used by support units until the end of the war.

Squadrons

Units

Postwar
The airfield returned to civilian use in 1947 but was suspended in 1954. In 1959 flying resumed at Redhill when the Tiger Club moved in. The following year Bristow Helicopters started to use Redhill as an operating base and carry out helicopter maintenance for the next 40 years.

The airfield is still operated for private flying and training, with an emphasis on helicopter operators, and additionally functions as an important reliever airport for Gatwick Airport. Pilots can use three grass runways. Information on the aerodrome's state can be found on the operator's, Redhill Aerodrome Limited, website.

The aerodrome has its own Air Traffic Control and fire and rescue services.

The airfield has also been the venue for the flying displays and aviation trade shows, including the annual Redhill Airshow in the past, which was focused around a charitable cause.

 
On 17 May 2012 it was announced that the owners of Redhill Aerodrome had again submitted a planning application for a hard runway after the previous plan had been rejected in 2011. Opponents at the time, including local MP Sam Gyimah, argued that the runway would "create an unacceptable level of noise and pollution and destroy the landscape". In June 2013 the second application was also refused. In February 2014 the aerodrome lost a planning appeal; it was appealing against the June 2013 decision to reject the planning application.

At the start of 2013, the Surrey and Sussex Air Ambulance service relocated its helicopter to Redhill from Dunsfold Aerodrome in order to enable it to provide a night flight service across Kent, Surrey and Sussex.

On 24 December 2013, the aerodrome suffered storm damage and flooding, with some light aircraft overturned.

Redhill Airshow

The Redhill Airshow was a "garden party" style event held at Redhill Aerodrome until 2006. The show has seen flypasts by the Red Arrows and displays from the Royal Air Force solo display teams, the Battle of Britain Memorial Flight including the Lancaster Bomber and other popular warbirds.

In June 2015, a smaller airshow was introduced under the title of the Redhill Aviation Festival.

See also
 List of Royal Air Force aircraft squadrons

References

Citations

Bibliography

External links

Airports in England
Transport in Surrey
Airshows in the United Kingdom
Airports in South East England